Herta Staal (29 March 1930 – 2 October 2021) was an Austrian film and television actress.

Selected filmography
 The Charming Young Lady (1953)
 The Dancing Heart (1953)
 My Sister and I (1954)
 Clivia (1954)
 The Great Lola (1954)
 Girl with a Future (1954)
 Royal Hunt in Ischl (1955)
 Where the Ancient Forests Rustle (1956)
 The Beautiful Master (1956)
 The Bath in the Barn (1956)
 The Winemaker of Langenlois (1957)
 Love Has to Be Learned (1963)

References

Bibliography
 Robert Dassanowsky. Austrian Cinema: A History. McFarland, 2005.

External links

 

1930 births
2021 deaths
Austrian film actresses
Austrian television actresses
20th-century Austrian actresses
Actresses from Vienna